Dragoslav Mihajlović (13 December 1906 – 18 June 1978) was a Yugoslav footballer. He played for the Yugoslav national team at the 1930 FIFA World Cup. In 1944 he emigrated to Sale, Australia.

References

External links
 Profile (Serbian)

1906 births
1978 deaths
People from Aleksinac
Yugoslav footballers
Yugoslavia international footballers
OFK Beograd players
1930 FIFA World Cup players
Yugoslav emigrants to Australia
Association football defenders